Annie: A Royal Adventure! (also known as Annie 2 or Annie 2: A Royal Adventure!) is a 1995 American comedy film and the sequel to the 1982 theatrical film Annie. It was released as a television film on ABC in the United States in 1995 and internationally in 1996, and is approximately 93 minutes long. The film has no songs apart from a reprise of "Tomorrow" sung at the end of the film, immediately after Daddy Warbucks is knighted.

None of the cast members from the previous film appear in this sequel. Annie, Daddy Warbucks, Molly, Punjab, Asp, Sandy, and Miss Hannigan are the only characters from the original to appear in this film. Grace, Rooster, Lilly and Mrs. Pugh are not in the sequel. Many of the original cast had either moved on to other projects or were too old for the sequel.

Plot
A year after the 1982 film, Oliver "Daddy" Warbucks (George Hearn), twelve year old Annie Warbucks (Ashley Johnson), their dog Sandy, Annie's new friend Hannah (Emily Ann Lloyd), an eccentric scientist (Ian McDiarmid), and Annie's old friend Molly (Camilla Belle) (who is still an orphan but gets adopted by the Webb family in the end), travel to Britain, where Warbucks is to be knighted by His Majesty the King. However, the kids and their new English friend Michael Webb (George Wood) get mixed up in the scheme of an evil noblewoman known as Lady Edwina Hogbottom (Joan Collins) to blow up Buckingham Palace while all the heirs to the throne are present for Daddy Warbucks' knighting.

Cast

 Ashley Johnson as Annie Warbucks
 Joan Collins as Lady Edwina Hogbottom
 George Hearn as Oliver "Daddy" Warbucks
 Ian McDiarmid as Dr. Eli Eon
 Emily Ann Lloyd as Hannah
 Camilla Belle as Molly
 Crispin Bonham-Carter as Rupert Hogbottom
 Perry Benson as Mean Murphy Knuckles
 Antony Zaki as Punjab
 David Tse as Asp
 Jayne Ashbourne as Charity
 Carol Cleveland as Miss Hannigan
 George Wood as Michael Webb
 Buffy Davis as Mrs. Webb
 Ian Redford as David Webb
 Timothy Bateson as Derwood
 Deborah MacLaren as Madame Charlotte
 Ann Morrish as Mrs. Fowler
 David King as Winston Churchill
 Tim Seely as The King
 Roger Bizley as Captain Thomas
 Mary Kay Bergman as Miss Hannigan / British children / New York children / additional voices (voice)
 Sam Mancuso as Newspaper Seller
 Sam Stockman as James
 Edward Highmore as Hotel Clerk

Reception
The film received a mixed reception from critics.

Home media
The film was released on VHS on November 14, 1995, and Region 1 and 2 DVD in 2004 and contained no special features, only a subtitle selection.

References

External links
 
 

1995 television films
1995 films
1995 comedy films
1990s musical comedy films
1990s English-language films
American Broadcasting Company original programming
American comedy television films
American musical comedy films
American sequel films
Films about orphans
Films based on American comics
Films based on comic strips
Films based on Little Orphan Annie
Films scored by David Michael Frank
Films set in 1943
Films set in London
Live-action films based on comics
Television sequel films
Films directed by Ian Toynton
1990s American films